The Australian Marine Complex (AMC) is a marine industry precinct located at Henderson, Western Australia, 23km south of the Perth CBD. It is located on Cockburn Sound.

Overview
The complex was established in 2003 when the Common User Facility, owned by the Western Australian Government, commenced operations. It is home to approximately 150 businesses in five designated zones. The facility is jointly operated by the Western Australian Department of Jobs, Tourism, Science and Innovation, the state government owned property developer DevelopmentWA and AMC Management (WA) Pty Ltd.

The complex is divided into shipbuilding, technology, support industry, fabrication and recreational boating precincts.

The recreational boating precinct, at the northern end of the complex, consists of the Jervoise Bay boat harbour. The fabrication precinct is located at the southern end of the complex, while the shipbuilding precinct is located along the coast between the two. The technology and support precincts are located inland, to the east.

Major tenants of the facility include Austal, BAE Systems Australia and Civmec.

In 2010, the A$60 million floating dock Yargan commenced operations at the Australian Marine Complex, Yargan being the Noongar word for tortoise. The dock is capable of lifting up to 12,000 tonnes from the water and to transfer up to 3500 tonnes from water to land. The dock's initially purpose was to serve as a maintenance facility for the Collins-class submarines.

In March 2022, Prime Minister Scott Morrison announced a A$4.3 billion investment to establish a large vessel dry dock at the Australian Marine Complex in Henderson. Construction of the facility is scheduled to start in 2023 and to be completed by 2030.

Anzac Mid-Life Capability Assurance Program

The Anzac-class frigates of the Royal Australian Navy currently undergo their Mid-Life Capability Assurance Program (AMCAP) at the Australian Marine Complex, with  being the first of the eight ships to complete this upgrade by 2019.  was the second ship to complete this program, returning to service in 2020,  the third and  the fourth to complete this service.

The upgrade is being carried out by the Warship Asset Management Agreement Alliance, an alliance of the Commonwealth of Australia, BAE Systems, SAAB Australia and Naval Ship Management Australia.

Austal

The Austal shipyard at the Australian Marine Complex built and delivered five Guardian-class patrol boats and Cape-class patrol boats in 2021, with the later two built of the Trinidad and Tobago Coast Guard while the former are destined for Pacific Island nations, having been ordered and financed by the Australian Department of Defense. In 2022, Austal is scheduled to deliver a further five Guardian-class patrol boats and four Cape-class patrol boats, the later for the Royal Australian Navy. All up, 21 Guardian-class patrol boats are scheduled to be built at the complex for twelve Pacific Island nations.

References

City of Cockburn
Shipyards of Australia
Maritime history of Western Australia
2003 establishments in Australia